The Primetime Emmy Award for Outstanding Directing for a Reality Program is awarded to one program each year. The category was created in 2018. Between 2003 and 2017, reality and documentary/nonfiction programs competed in a combined category.

In the following list, the first titles listed in gold are the winners; those not in gold are nominees, which are listed in alphabetical order. The years given are those in which the ceremonies took place:



Winners and nominations

2000s

2010s

2020s

Programs with multiple wins
2 wins
 RuPaul's Drag Race

Programs with multiple nominations

9 nominations
 The Amazing Race

5 nominations
 RuPaul's Drag Race
 Top Chef

4 nominations
 Project Runway
 Queer Eye

3 nominations
 Shark Tank

2 nominations
 American Idol
 American Ninja Warrior
 Cheer
 Survivor
 The Voice

Individuals with multiple wins
2 wins
 Nick Murray

Individuals with multiple nominations

9 nominations
 Bertram van Munster

5 nominations
 Nick Murray

3 nominations
 Ken Fuchs

2 nominations
 Hisham Abed
 Ariel Boles
 Alan Carter
 Bruce Gowers
 Patrick McManus
 Craig Spirko
 Paul Starkman
 Glenn Weiss
 Greg Whiteley

References

External links
 Academy of Television Arts and Sciences website

Directing for a Reality Program